The Kirkwood Islands are a scattered group of reefs and rocks, with one larger island, lying in the central part of Marguerite Bay,  south-southwest of the Faure Islands, Antarctica. The islands were sighted in 1949 from the Falkland Islands Dependencies Survey vessel John Biscoe, and a running survey was made from the ship in 1950. They are named for Commander Henry Kirkwood, Royal Navy, in command of the John Biscoe at that time.

See also 
 List of Antarctic and sub-Antarctic islands

References

Islands of Graham Land
Fallières Coast